Sadovoye is a rural locality (a selo) and the administrative center of Sadovskoye Rural Settlement, Bykovsky District, Volgograd Oblast, Russia. The population was 466 as of 2010. There are 8 streets.

Geography 
Sadovoye is located in Zavolzhye, 44 km east of Bykovo (the district's administrative centre) by road. Krasnoselets is the nearest rural locality.

References 

Rural localities in Bykovsky District